Parchis: The Documentary is a documentary about Parchis, a Spanish band with boys and girls who made a string of successful songs and films in the '80s, both in Spain and globally.

The documentary was released by Netflix on July 10, 2019.

Premise
Parchis: The Documentary includes interviews with Yolanda, David, Tino, Gemma and Frank, as well as the group's managers. The film is focused on the success and downfall of the group.

Cast
 
 Tino Fernández
 David Muñoz
 Gemma Termes Prat
 Yolanda Ventura
Óscar Ferrer

References

External links
 
 

2019 documentary films
2019 films
2010s Spanish-language films
Netflix original documentary films
2010s Spanish films